Hamlyn is a UK publishing company founded by Paul Hamlyn in 1950 with an initial investment of £350. His desire was to create "fine books with the common touch" which remains the foundation of its commercial success. It is part of the Octopus Publishing Group, now owned by Hachette Livre.

History
Paul Hamlyn sold the company to the International Publishing Company (now Time Inc. UK) in 1964, but stayed on until 1969.

In 1964 Hamlyn commenced in Australia under the management of Kevin Weldon.  It owned an interest in the Australian independent paperback publisher Sun Books from 1968 until 1971 when Macmillan Australia acquired that company.

Paul Hamlyn bought the company back in 1986 and added it to the holdings of his new company, Octopus Books. Octopus was sold in 1987 to Reed International. Hamlyn's children's division was sold to the Egmont Group in 1998. Hachette Livre bought Octopus in 2001.

Hamlyn is an international publisher of non-fiction illustrated books. Two thirds of the business is in international, North American and export markets. Since 2003 the publisher has made two significant acquisitions:

Godsfield Press was acquired by Hamlyn in October 2003. It is a niche international publisher of illustrated books for the spirituality and alternative health market.

Gaia Books was acquired in March 2004. It is a producer of international co-editions in the field of alternative philosophies and lifestyle.

Octopus Books was sold to Lagardère Group and managed under Lagardère Publishing.

Book series
ENCYCLOPEDIA Of Nature
 Adventures from History
 Art and Mankind
 Art of the Western World
 Cameo Series
 The Colour Library of Art 
 The Colour Library of Art Paperbacks
 Concise Guide in Colour series
 Great Buildings of the World
 Hamlyn All-Colour Paperbacks
 Hamlyn Classics
 Landmarks of the World's Art
 Learning With Colour
 Museums of the World
 Odyssey Library
 Pearson's Illustrated Car Servicing Series for Owner Drivers
 Pocket Merlin series
 Portraits of Greatness Series
 The RIBA Drawings Series
 Round The Year Storybooks
 Storytime Gift Books

References

Sources

External links 
Official website in 1999 (archive copy)
Official website in 2005 (archive copy)
Official website in 2007 (archive copy)
Hamlyn imprint of Octopus Publishing
Octopus Publishing Group website

Book publishing companies of the United Kingdom
Publishing companies established in 1950